Orr is a city in Saint Louis County, Minnesota, United States. The population was 211 at the 2020 census.

U.S. Highway 53 serves as a main route in Orr.

Orr is located within the Kabetogama State Forest in Saint Louis County.

History
Orr got its start as a lumber town. A post office called Orr has been in operation since 1907. William Orr, an early postmaster, gave the community its name.

Geography

Orr is along Pelican Lake.

Demographics

2010 census
As of the census of 2010, there were 267 people, 117 households, and 69 families living in the city. The racial makeup of the city was 80.9% White, 18.4% Native American, and 0.7% from two or more races.

There were 117 households, of which 28.2% had children under the age of 18 living with them, 41.0% were married couples living together, 13.7% had a female householder with no husband present, 4.3% had a male householder with no wife present, and 41.0% were non-families. 36.8% of all households were made up of individuals, and 9.4% had someone living alone who was 65 years of age or older. The average household size was 2.28 and the average family size was 2.96.

The median age in the city was 42.1 years. 23.6% of residents were under the age of 18; 7% were between the ages of 18 and 24; 23.6% were from 25 to 44; 31.1% were from 45 to 64; and 14.6% were 65 years of age or older. The gender makeup of the city was 51.3% male and 48.7% female.

2000 census
As of the census of 2000, there were 249 people, 112 households, and 70 families living in the city. The racial makeup of the city was 84.74% White, 13.25% Native American, and 2.01% from two or more races. Hispanic or Latino of any race were 0.40% of the population. 16.2% were of Finnish, 15.7% Irish, 13.0% German, 9.2% Norwegian, 6.5% Swedish and 5.4% American ancestry.

There were 112 households, out of which 33.0% had children under the age of 18 living with them, 50.9% were married couples living together, 6.3% had a female householder with no husband present, and 37.5% were non-families. 36.6% of all households were made up of individuals, and 23.2% had someone living alone who was 65 years of age or older. The average household size was 2.22 and the average family size was 2.87.

In the city, the population was spread out, with 25.7% under the age of 18, 6.0% from 18 to 24, 27.3% from 25 to 44, 20.5% from 45 to 64, and 20.5% who were 65 years of age or older. The median age was 38 years. For every 100 females, there were 100.8 males. For every 100 females age 18 and over, there were 90.7 males.

The median income for a household in the city was $27,222, and the median income for a family was $38,571. Males had a median income of $32,292 versus $15,000 for females. The per capita income for the city was $14,776. About 12.9% of families and 16.4% of the population were below the poverty line, including 7.4% of those under the age of eighteen and 33.3% of those 65 or over.

Infrastructure

Transportation
Orr Regional Airport

References

Cities in Minnesota
Cities in St. Louis County, Minnesota
Mining communities in Minnesota